The Narrows is a community in the Canadian province of Manitoba. Situated on the Northern part of Lake Manitoba within the Municipality of West Interlake. It is notable as the only place where Lake Manitoba is traversed by use of a bridge.

A Post Office was opened at a location on 14-24-10W in 1896. The post office service was terminated in 1958. A school district was located on SE 24-24-10W. There are two Lake St. Martin First Nation reserves (The Narrows 49 and Narrows 49 A) located in the surrounding areas.

References 
 Geographic Names of Manitoba (pg. 271) - the Millennium Bureau of Canada

External links 
 Historic Sites of Manitoba: Lake Manitoba Narrows
 Historic Sites of Manitoba: The Narrows School No. 1450

Narrows